The Parc animalier de Sainte-Croix is a French Zoo specialised in European fauna, located inside the park parc naturel régional de Lorraine in Rhodes.

The Zoo was founded 1980 by Gérald Singer.

References

Notes 

Zoos in France
Zoos established in 1980
Buildings and structures in Moselle (department)
Tourist attractions in Moselle (department)
Organizations based in Grand Est